Yakatarla (formerly: Nernek) is a village in the district of Gülşehir, Nevşehir Province, Turkey.

History 
Nisa (Ancient Greek: Νίσα) was a small village. Its name was later changed to Muşkara, then to Nernek, and finally to its current name of Yakatarla.

The name of the village is mentioned as Nernek in the records of 1928.

The Legend of Nisa 
The Legend of Nisa is a folk legend in which a princess by the same name sat on top the hills overlooking the village. It is suspected that a castle containing gold was once built there.

Population

References 

Villages in Gülşehir District